Blaine County is a county in the U.S. state of Idaho. As of the 2020 United States Census, the population was 24,272. The county seat and largest city is Hailey. It is also home to the Sun Valley ski resort, adjacent to Ketchum.

Blaine County was created by the territorial legislature on March 5, 1895, by combining Alturas and Logan counties; it was named for former congressman and 1884 Republican presidential nominee James G. Blaine. Its present boundaries were set on February 8, 1917, when a western portion was partitioned off to form Camas County.

Blaine County is part of the Hailey, ID Micropolitan Statistical Area.

History

The Wood River Valley in present-day Blaine County was organized as part of Alturas County by the Idaho Territorial Legislature in 1864. By the 1880s the valley supported a thriving mining commerce; in 1882 the county seat of Alturas County was moved from Rocky Bar in present-day Elmore County to Hailey, in response to a population shift from Rocky Bar – which would eventually become a ghost town – to the Wood River Valley.

The Blaine County boundaries described in its 1895 creation ordinance contained lands that soon were partitioned off to form other counties. Only thirteen days after the official formation date of Blaine, Lincoln County was formed from the county. Lincoln itself was later partitioned to create Gooding (1913), Minidoka (1913), and Jerome (1919) counties.  Blaine County was further reduced in 1917 when Camas County was formed.

The strong mining economy of the 1880s had substantially declined by 1890, when Idaho Territory became a state. The county began to recast itself as a tourism destination in 1936 with the opening of the Sun Valley resort, originally owned by the Union Pacific Railroad. The area soon attracted celebrity visitors, and later residents, most notably Ernest Hemingway, who is buried in the Ketchum Cemetery. Celebrities who have lived in Blaine County include Adam West, Demi Moore, and  John Kerry.

County profile
Most Blaine County residents live in the Wood River Valley along State Highway 75 in the western half of the county. This area includes all of the county's incorporated cities and towns except Carey, which is located in the south-central part of the county at the junction of US 20 with US 26/93. The county's gerrymandered southeastern panhandle, known locally as the Yale area, is sparsely populated.

As the home of a major ski resort, Blaine County has a higher cost of living than surrounding areas; the median value of its owner-occupied housing units is more than double the state average. As a result, many who work in Blaine County live in outlying areas, particularly in the city of Shoshone in neighboring Lincoln County. It is estimated that 2,540 people from outside the county commute to work in Blaine County.

Government and politics
Since 1992, Blaine County has gained a reputation as a Democratic Party enclave in strongly Republican Idaho. The Democratic presidential candidate has won the county in every election since; that year, incumbent George H. W. Bush finished third behind Bill Clinton and Ross Perot. In 2000 and 2004, Blaine was the only Idaho county carried by Al Gore and John Kerry, respectively.   Barack Obama carried the county in 2008 by a 33.2% margin over John McCain, while McCain won statewide by a 25.3% margin. It was one of three counties (Latah, Teton) in Idaho won by Obama in 2008, and by far the highest margin. In 2020, Joe Biden defeated incumbent Donald Trump in the county by 36.8 percentage points, with his 67.1% vote share being the highest for any Democrat since 1900.

Obama also carried Blaine County in 2012 with 58.8 percent of the vote, compared to Mitt Romney's 38.7 percent. Blaine County was the only Idaho county in which Obama received over 50 percent of the vote, although he also carried Latah County with 49.6 percent of the vote. From 1968 through 1988, a less populated Blaine County was won by the Republican candidate in all six presidential elections, as was the state of Idaho, although even then the county voted more Democratic than Idaho as a whole in every election going back to 1924.

Similar to other Idaho counties, an elected three-member county commission heads the county government. Other elected officials include clerk, treasurer, sheriff, assessor, and prosecutor.

In 2006, Blaine County voted 66.3% against HJR 2, which amended the Idaho Constitution to outlaw same-sex marriage in Idaho; the measure passed with 63.4% of the statewide vote. Latah County,  (Moscow, home of the University of Idaho), was the only other county where the measure failed.

At the state level, Blaine County is located in Legislative District 25, which currently has an all-Democratic delegation in the Idaho Legislature. Michelle Stennett, the current minority leader of the Idaho Senate, and Wendy Jaquet, a member of the Idaho House of Representatives and a former minority leader of that body, both live in Ketchum.

Geography

Adjacent counties

 Butte County – northeast
 Bingham County – east
 Power County – southeast
 Cassia County – south
 Minidoka County – southeast
 Lincoln County – south
 Camas County – west
 Elmore County – northwest
 Custer County – northwest

Major highways

  – US 20
  – US 26
  – US 93
  – Sawtooth Scenic Byway

National protected areas

 Craters of the Moon National Monument (part)
 Minidoka National Wildlife Refuge (part)
 Salmon-Challis National Forest (part)
 Sawtooth National Forest (part)
 Sawtooth National Recreation Area (part)
 Hemingway–Boulders Wilderness (part)
 Sawtooth Wilderness (part)

Demographics

2000 census
As of the 2000 United States Census, there were 18,991 people, 7,780 households, and 4,839 families in the county. The population density was 7 people per square mile (3/km2). There were 12,186 housing units at an average density of 5 per square mile (2/km2). The racial makeup of the county was 90.73% White, 0.13% Black or African American, 0.33% Native American, 0.73% Asian, 0.07% Pacific Islander, 6.43% from other races, and 1.57% from two or more races. 10.69% of the population were Hispanic or Latino of any race. 17.0% were of English, 14.6% German, 10.8% Irish and 6.2% American ancestry.

There were 7,780 households, out of which 31.90% had children under the age of 18 living with them, 51.20% were married couples living together, 7.20% had a female householder with no husband present, and 37.80% were non-families. 27.30% of all households were made up of individuals, and 5.50% had someone living alone who was 65 years of age or older.  The average household size was 2.40 and the average family size was 2.96.

The county population contained 24.00% under the age of 18, 7.70% from 18 to 24, 32.60% from 25 to 44, 27.90% from 45 to 64, and 7.80% who were 65 years of age or older. The median age was 37 years. For every 100 females there were 107.90 males. For every 100 females age 18 and over, there were 106.80 males.

The median income for a household in the county was $50,496, and the median income for a family was $60,037. Males had a median income of $35,949 versus $27,487 for females. The per capita income for the county was $31,346.  About 4.90% of families and 7.80% of the population were below the poverty line, including 7.80% of those under age 18 and 5.30% of those age 65 or over.

2010 census
As of the 2010 United States Census, there were 21,376 people, 8,823 households, and 5,575 families in the county. The racial makeup of the county was 84.9% white, 0.9% Asian, 0.6% American Indian, 0.2% black or African American, 0.1% Pacific islander, 11.8% from other races, and 1.5% from two or more races. Those of Hispanic or Latino origin made up 20.0% of the population. In terms of ancestry, 24.1% were German, 18.8% were English, 11.4% were Irish, and 7.9% were American.

Of the 8,823 households, 32.1% had children under the age of 18 living with them, 51.8% were married couples living together, 7.3% had a female householder with no husband present, 36.8% were non-families, and 28.7% of all households were made up of individuals. The average household size was 2.39 and the average family size was 2.99. The median age was 40.4 years.

The median income for a household in the county was $61,854 and the median income for a family was $73,929. Males had a median income of $48,036 versus $37,603 for females. The per capita income for the county was $32,656. About 4.9% of families and 9.3% of the population were below the poverty line, including 10.9% of those under age 18 and 8.2% of those age 65 or over.

Education
All but one public school in the county is administered by the Blaine County School District. There are two public high schools in the county, Wood River High School in Hailey, and Carey High School in Carey. Syringa Mountain School is the first charter school to be approved in Blaine County; it opened in 2014. The rural Yale area in the county's southeastern panhandle is served by schools in neighboring Minidoka County.

Private schools include Community School in Sun Valley and The Sage School in Hailey.

The College of Southern Idaho, a community college based in Twin Falls, operates an off-campus outreach center in Hailey.

Communities

Cities

 Bellevue
 Carey
 Hailey
 Ketchum
 Sun Valley

Census-designated place 

 Gannett

Unincorporated communities

 Cathedral Pines
 Doniphan
 Galena
 Gimlet
 Picabo
 Triumph
 Sawtooth City
 Stanton Crossing
 Tikura

Ghost towns
 Boulder
 Vienna

Festivals
Blaine County hosts Wagon Days, Trailing of the Sheep Festival, Sun Valley Harvest Festival, and the Sun Valley for the Arts Wine Auction, among other events.

The Blaine County Fair is an annual summer event.

See also
 National Register of Historic Places listings in Blaine County, Idaho

References

External links
 Official site
 Blaine County at Idaho.gov
 Visit Sun Valley
 Blaine County Fair 

 
Idaho counties
1895 establishments in Idaho
Populated places established in 1895